Salar de Ascotán, also known as Salar de Cebollar, is a salt flat in northern Chile. The basin is bordered on the north by the Salar de Carcote basin, on the east by small endorheic basins, including those of Laguna Cañapa and Laguna Hedionda, from which is separated by the crest of the Cerros de Cañapa, Cerro Araral and others. To the south, the basin is bordered by the San Pedro de Inacaliri River basin, while to the west the drainage divide between the salt flat and the Upper Loa River basin is marked by the summits of a chain of volcanoes culminating in Palpana.

References

Ascotan
Volcanoes of Antofagasta Region